Bishop Walsh Catholic School is a coeducational secondary school and sixth form with academy status, located in Sutton Coldfield, Birmingham in the West Midlands of England. The school is part of the St. Paul McGrath II Multi-Academy Company.

Buildings

In 2019 the school requested planning permission for an extension to the building to replace temporary classrooms. These had been on the site since 2008 and, because of their damp condition, were thought to be causing minor illnesses for students and staff. The new extension is planned to provide sixth-form accommodation.

School performance

The school's first inspection following academisation was in 2016, with the judgement of Good. There was a further inspection in 2020, which repeated the judgement of Good.

References

Secondary schools in Birmingham, West Midlands
Catholic secondary schools in the Archdiocese of Birmingham
Academies in Birmingham, West Midlands